The bridled titmouse (Baeolophus wollweberi) is a small songbird, a passerine bird in the tit family Paridae.

These birds range from 11.5 – 12.7 cm. (4.5 to 5 in.) long. It is small, crested and gray with a black and white patterned face, a black bib. Its crest is boarded with black and white (sometimes gray) underparts. A standard nest ranges from 5 – 9 eggs colored white, speckled, or reddish brown.

Their preferred habitat are oak or oak-juniper mixed woodland riparian areas of mountains in eastern and southeastern Arizona – (the Mogollon Plateau and White Mountains of Arizona), and extreme southwestern New Mexico – (the Madrean sky islands region of the eastern Sonora Desert) in the United States to southern Mexico. They nest in a hole in a tree, either a natural cavity or sometimes an old woodpecker nest found 4 – 28 ft. off the ground. They line the nest with soft materials. Usually built from loose cups of cottonwood down, stems, leaves, and grass.

These birds are permanent residents and may join small mixed flocks in winter. They forage actively on branches, sometimes on the ground, mainly eating insects, especially caterpillars, but also seeds, nuts and berries. They will store food for later use. The song is usually described as a whistled pidi-pidi-pidi-pidi.  They make a variety of different sounds, most having a similar tone quality.

References

External links
Bridled titmouse photo eNature
RangeMaps & synopsis InfoNatura NatureServe
Bridled titmouse photo gallery VIREO

bridled titmouse
Mogollon Rim
White Mountains (Arizona)
Native birds of the Southwestern United States
Birds of Mexico
Birds of the Sierra Madre Occidental
Birds of the Sierra Madre del Sur
Birds of the Trans-Mexican Volcanic Belt
bridled titmouse
bridled titmouse